The Enovate ME-S, known fully as the Enovate ME-Sports, is an electric concept vehicle developed by Enovate.

Overview

The Enovate ME-S is a 4-door sports car concept shown at the 2019 Auto Shanghai.

Production plans
It was planned to go into production in 2021. The planned production ME-S model can go 0-62 mph in 3 seconds, can charge up to 80% in 15 minutes, and has a Level 4 autonomy. It costs $55,000.

See also
Enovate

References

Sports sedans
Electric sports cars
Luxury vehicles
Cars introduced in 2019
Cars of China
Electric concept cars